Wiremu Doherty is a New Zealand Māori educationalist and academic of Tūhoe and  Ngāti Awa descent. He is the past-principal of the first kaupapa Māori school. He received his PhD in education from the Auckland University in 2010 and is currently a professor at Te Whare Wānanga o Awanuiārangi and chair of the Māori strategy committee for New Zealand Qualifications Authority.

References

Academic staff of Te Whare Wānanga o Awanuiārangi
Living people
Ngāi Tūhoe people
University of Auckland alumni
Māori language revivalists
Year of birth missing (living people)
New Zealand Māori academics